Harley James (born 29 July 1978) is a New Zealand cricketer. He played in five first-class matches for Canterbury from 1997 to 2001.

See also
 List of Canterbury representative cricketers

References

External links
 

1978 births
Living people
New Zealand cricketers
Canterbury cricketers
Cricketers from Wellington City